Mordellistena imitatrix is a beetle in the genus Mordellistena of the family Mordellidae. It was described in 1995 by Allen.

References

imitatrix
Beetles described in 1995